Heremites is a genus of skinks.

Species
The following 3 species, listed alphabetically by specific name, are recognized as being valid:

Heremites auratus (Linnaeus, 1758) – levant skink, golden grass mabuya, golden grass skink
Heremites septemtaeniatus (Reuss, 1834) – golden grass mabuya, southern grass skink
Heremites vittatus (Olivier, 1804) – bridled mabuya, bridled skink

Nota bene: A binomial authority in parentheses indicates that the species was originally described in a genus other than Heremites.

References

 
Lizard genera
Taxa named by John Edward Gray